Harry Josiah Eccles (July 9, 1893 – June 2, 1955), nicknamed "Bugs", was an American professional baseball pitcher. He appeared in five games for the Philadelphia Athletics of Major League Baseball during the  season, with his only major league decision coming in what would also prove his only start, in his final appearance, against the Chicago White Sox on September 27, allowing all six runs over three innings in the 6–5 defeat. Eccles would go on to appear in the International League in 1916, compiling a mark of 3-3, but never appear in professional baseball thereafter.

References

Major League Baseball pitchers
Philadelphia Athletics players
Baseball players from New York (state)
1893 births
1955 deaths
People from Chautauqua County, New York